|}

The Gainsborough Chase is a National Hunt handicap steeplechase in England which is open to horses aged five years or older. 
It is run at Sandown Park over a distance of 3 miles (3 miles and 37 yards, or 4,862 metres), and it is scheduled to take place each year in late January or early February.

The race was first run in 1954 and in the sixties was won three times by Mill House.

The Gainsborough Chase name was dropped in 1991, when the race was renamed the Agfa Diamond Chase, a Limited Handicap holding Grade 2 status. Agfa sponsored the race until 2007.

The race last carried Grade 2 status in 1997 and in recent years it has become a normal (albeit valuable) Class B handicap, currently sponsored by Virgin Bet.

Winners

 The 1985 edition was a walkover.

See also
Horseracing in Great Britain
List of British National Hunt races

References
Racing Post:

External links
 Race Recordings 

National Hunt races in Great Britain
National Hunt chases
Sandown Park Racecourse
Recurring sporting events established in 1954